Nightmare in the Sun is a 1965 film drama directed by Marc Lawrence, and written by George Fass and Fanya Foss, about a murderous affair.

Derek starred along with Ursula Andress and Aldo Ray. Smaller roles in the film featured Sammy Davis, Jr. and Robert Duvall.

Plot
Beautiful young Marsha Wilson is married to Sam, a wealthy, jealous, much-older man. She is having an affair with the sheriff.

Marsha picks up a handsome hitch-hiker one day, and brings him to husband's ranch and falls for him.

Marsha wants to run off with the hitch-hiker, but he too is married and won't take her along. Sam returns home in a jealous rage, discovers what happened and kills Marsha with a rifle in a drunken rage.

The town's sheriff concocts a scheme to blackmail Sam, promising to frame the hitch-hiker for Marsha's murder if Sam provides a hefty payment.

The hitch-hiker is caught and jailed, escapes and then is recaptured. By then, a remorseful Sam has had enough. He kills the sheriff, then confesses to committing both murders.

Cast
 Ursula Andress as Marsha Wilson
 John Derek as the Hitch-Hiker
 Aldo Ray as the Sheriff
 Arthur O'Connell as Sam Wilson
 Sammy Davis Jr. as Truck Driver
 Robert Duvall as Motorcyclist
 Richard Jaeckel as Motorcyclist
 Allyn Joslyn as Junk Dealer
 Keenan Wynn as Song and Dance Man
 Chick Chandler as Bartender

Production
Marc Lawrence was best known as an actor, but he had moved into directing television. He helped come up with the original story, and his wife co-wrote the screenplay. The movie was financed by Ricky du Pont, one of the very rich du Pont family. Du Pont wanted on screen credit but Lawrence refused, stating in a later interview that "I said, 'I can't. If all these guys knew the money came from a millionaire, they'd cut my throat. If I sell the picture and your name is on it, I won't get a penny for it'." However Hedda Hopper announced that Du Pont financed the film in her column in September 1963.

Sammy Davis Jr. played a cameo and was reportedly going to sing the title track, but it is not in the final film.

Filming started on 13 September 1963. The movie was filmed in and around Calabasas, California over 15 days. Several of the cast agreed to appear for less than their usual fees as a favor to Lawrence. Lawrence made John Derek a co-producer in order that his then-wife Ursula Andress would do a nude scene. He says this would be in the scene at the beginning "when Aldo Ray rapes her" (although in the final film the sex is consensual).

"Derek promised to allow his wife Ursula to do a nude scene with Aldo Ray", Lawrence later wrote, "but the day before shooting he changed his mind. Years later he did a nude layout of Ursula for Playboy and got $15,000 for his art."

DuPont hindered filming by insisting filming should be dictated by astrology.

After filming was completed, Lawrence assembled a rough cut which Du Pont bought for $50,000. "When I got a $50,000 note to get out of the picture, they put in a nude scene", claimed Lawrence.

He defaulted on his payments and release of the film was held up when Lawrence attempted to reclaim his money or ownership of the film.

Lawrence only directed one more film, Daddy's Deadly Darling.

See also
 List of American films of 1965

References

External links
 
 
 
Joe Dante at "Nightmare in the Sun at Trailers from Hell

1965 films
American crime drama films
1965 crime drama films
Adultery in films
1965 directorial debut films
1960s English-language films
Films directed by Marc Lawrence
1960s American films